Take the Hint is an Australian television game show which aired 1962-1966 on the Nine Network. Although popular enough to run for four years, not much information about the series is available on the Internet. It appears to have been based on American series Password.

Produced in Sydney, it was a 30-minute series hosted by Frank Wilson.

At one point during the run of the series in Sydney, it was preceded on the schedule by It Could Be You and followed by Keynotes and this was also the case during the same period in Melbourne.

Game play
Two teams, each consisting of a contestant and guest personality, play a word game, in which the guest has to convey a word to their partner without saying the word.

Episode status
Archive status is unknown. A brief 17-second clip appeared on YouTube but has since been removed, suggesting that an episode or episodes have existed more recently.

References

External links
 

Nine Network original programming
1962 Australian television series debuts
1966 Australian television series endings
Black-and-white Australian television shows
1960s Australian game shows
English-language television shows